The 1913 Australian federal election was held in Australia on 31 May 1913. All 75 seats in the House of Representatives, and 18 of the 36 seats in the Senate were up for election. The incumbent Labor Party, led by Prime Minister Andrew Fisher, was defeated by the opposition Commonwealth Liberal Party under Joseph Cook. The new government had a majority of just a single seat, and held a minority of seats in the Senate. It would last only 15 months, suffering defeat at the 1914 election.

The 1913 election was held in conjunction with six referendum questions, none of which were carried. According to David Day, Andrew Fisher's biographer, "it was probably the timing of the referenda that was most responsible for the disappointing election result" for the Labor Party.

Results

House of Representatives 

Notes
 Three members were elected unopposed – one Liberal and two Labor.

Senate

Seats changing hands

 Members listed in italics did not contest their seat at this election.

Post-election pendulum

See also
 Candidates of the 1913 Australian federal election
 Members of the Australian House of Representatives, 1913–1914
 Members of the Australian Senate, 1913–1914

Notes

References
University of WA election results in Australia since 1890

Federal elections in Australia
1913 elections in Australia
May 1913 events